Urbano Antillón (born September 5, 1982) is an American former professional boxer. He challenged twice for a lightweight world title, and held the WBO–NABO and NABF super featherweight titles.

Early life
Antillón was born to Urbano and Amelia Antillon and is the youngest of four children. He was born and raised in Maywood, California.

Amateur career
Antillón became active in karate and boxing at a young age, choosing boxing as his career choice. To this day, Antillón still trains at the Maywood Boxing Club, in Maywood, California.

After 40 amateur fights, Urbano decided to turned pro at the age of eighteen, under the tutelage of trainer Rudy Hernandez. In 2005, Antillón was signed by Top Rank, the boxing promotion company founded by Bob Arum.

Professional career
Defeating the likes of Daniel Attah, Bobby Pacquiao in the first round, Fernando Trejo, Roque Cassiani, José Luis Soto Karass and Ivan Valle. Antillón has won two regional titles, WBO NABO and NABF in the Super Featherweight division.

WBA Lightweight title
In July 2009, Antillón the pride of Maywood California, fought Miguel Acosta for the interim WBA Lightweight Championship. Antillon was upset in the bout, being knocked out in the 9th round with an uppercut.

WBC Lightweight title
On December 4, 2010, Urbano lost to WBC Lightweight Champion Humberto Soto at the Honda Center in Anaheim, California.

WBA Lightweight title

In his next bout Antillón lost to undefeated WBA Lightweight Champion, Brandon Ríos.

Professional record

|- style="margin:0.5em auto; font-size:95%;"
| style="text-align:center;" colspan="8"|29 Wins (21 knockouts), 3 Losses, 0 Draw
|-  style="text-align:center; margin:0.5em auto; font-size:95%; background:#e3e3e3;"
|  style="border-style:none none solid solid; "|Res.
|  style="border-style:none none solid solid; "|Record
|  style="border-style:none none solid solid; "|Opponent
|  style="border-style:none none solid solid; "|Type
|  style="border-style:none none solid solid; "|Rd., Time
|  style="border-style:none none solid solid; "|Date
|  style="border-style:none none solid solid; "|Venue and Location
|  style="border-style:none none solid solid; "|Notes
|- align=center
|Win || 29-3-0 ||align=left| Leonardo Resendiz
|TKO || 2 (8) || March 15, 2013 || align=left|Explanada Municipal, Tepeji del Río de Ocampo, Mexico
|align=left|
|- align=center
|Loss || 28-3-0  ||align=left| Brandon Ríos
|TKO || 3  || July 9, 2011 || align=left|Home Depot Center, Carson, California
|align=left|For WBA Lightweight title
|- align=center
|Loss || 28-2-0 ||align=left| Humberto Soto
|UD || 12  || December 4, 2010 || align=left|Honda Center, Anaheim, California
|align=left|For WBC Lightweight title
|- align=center
|Win || 28-1-0 ||align=left| Rene Gonzalez
| UD || 10 (10) || May 8, 2010 || align=left|La Feria de San Marcos, Aguascalientes, Mexico
|align=left|
|- align=center
|Win || 27-1-0 ||align=left| Luis Antonio Arceo
|TKO || 3 (10) || February 20, 2010 || align=left|Discoteca El Alebrije, Acapulco, Mexico
|align=left|
|- align=center
|Loss || 26-1-0 ||align=left| Miguel Acosta
|TKO || 9 (12) || July 25, 2009 || align=left|Palenque del Recinto Ferial, Acapulco, Mexico
|align=left|For interim WBA Lightweight title
|- align=center
|Win || 26-0-0 ||align=left| Tyrone Harris
|TKO || 5 (10) || May 1, 2009 || align=left|Hard Rock Hotel and Casino, Las Vegas, Nevada, U.S.
|align=left|
|- align=center
|Win || 25-0-0 ||align=left| Juan Ramon Cruz
|KO || 4 (10) || December 12, 2008 || align=left|Alameda Swap Meet, Los Angeles, California, U.S.
|align=left|
|- align=center
|Win || 24-0-0 ||align=left| Daniel Attah
|KO || 4 (12) || September 5, 2008 || align=left|Isleta Casino & Resort, Albuquerque, New Mexico, U.S.
|align=left|
|- align=center
|Win || 23-0-0 ||align=left| Jose Leonardo Cruz
|TKO|| 6 (8) || June 6, 2008 || align=left|Sovereign Performing Arts Center, Reading, Pennsylvania, U.S.
|align=left|
|- align=center
|Win || 22-0-0 ||align=left| Bobby Pacquiao
|KO|| 1 (10) || March 13, 2008 || align=left|Hard Rock Hotel and Casino, Las Vegas, Nevada, U.S.
|align=left|
|- align=center
|Win || 21-0-0 ||align=left| Adrian Valdez
|TKO|| 1 (10) || December 21, 2007 || align=left|Dickerson's Event Center, Las Cruces, New Mexico, U.S.
|align=left|
|- align=center
|Win || 20-0-0 ||align=left| Wilson Alcorro
|KO|| 2 (10) || October 2, 2007 || align=left|Hard Rock Hotel and Casino, Las Vegas, Nevada, U.S.
|align=left|
|- align=center
|Win || 19-0-0 ||align=left| Thongchai Por Pratompong	
|TKO|| 2 (8) || July 7, 2007 || align=left|Korakuen Hall, Tokyo, Japan
|align=left|
|- align=center
|Win || 18-0-0 ||align=left| Roberto Mares
|TKO|| 3 (8) || July 14, 2006 || align=left|Charro Ranch, San Antonio, Texas, U.S.
|align=left|
|- align=center
|Win || 17-0-0 ||align=left| Fernando Trejo
|SD|| 10 (10) || December 23, 2005 || align=left|Sycuan Resort & Casino, El Cajon, California, U.S.
|align=left|
|- align=center
|Win || 16-0-0 ||align=left| Roque Cassiani
|UD|| 8 (8) || September 17, 2005 || align=left|America West Arena Phoenix, Arizona, U.S.
|align=left|
|- align=center
|Win || 15-0-0 ||align=left| José Luis Soto Karass
|TKO|| 5 (8) || May 6, 2005 || align=left|Fort McDowell Casino, Fountain Hills, Arizona, U.S.
|align=left|
|- align=center
|Win || 14-0-0 ||align=left| Juan Carlos Martinez
|TKO|| 6 (8) || October 23, 2004 || align=left|Activity Center, Maywood, California, U.S.
|align=left|
|- align=center
|Win || 13-0-0 ||align=left| Ramon Ortiz
|KO|| 1 (6) || July 16, 2004 || align=left|Memorial Civic Center, Canton, Ohio, U.S.
|align=left|
|- align=center
|Win || 12-0-0 ||align=left| Adan Hernandez
|UD|| 10 (10) || December 11, 2003 || align=left|Olympic Auditorium, Los Angeles, California, U.S.
|align=left|
|- align=center
|Win || 11-0-0 ||align=left| Martin Bermudez
|TKO|| 6 (8) || September 13, 2003 || align=left|MGM Grand, Las Vegas, Nevada, U.S.
|align=left|
|- align=center
|Win || 10-0-0 ||align=left| Ivan Valle
|UD|| 10 (10) || June 19, 2003 || align=left|Olympic Auditorium, Los Angeles, California, U.S.
|align=left|
|- align=center
|Win || 9-0-0 ||align=left| Leobardo Roman
|KO|| 2 (4) || March 23, 2003 || align=left|Pechanga Resort & Casino, Temecula, California, U.S.
|align=left|
|- align=center
|Win || 8-0-0 ||align=left| Orlando Jesus Soto
|TKO|| 5 (6) || December 13, 2002 || align=left|Desert Diamond Casino, Tucson, Arizona, U.S.
|align=left|
|- align=center
|Win || 7-0-0 ||align=left| Oscar Villa
|TKO|| 3 (8) || November 7, 2002 || align=left|Hilton Hotel, Burbank, California, U.S.
|align=left|
|- align=center
|Win || 6-0-0 ||align=left| Carlos Arnoldo Cisneros
|TKO|| 6 (6) || May 17, 2002 || align=left|Blaisdell Center Arena, Honolulu, Hawaii, U.S.
|align=left|
|- align=center
|Win || 5-0-0 ||align=left| Jose Luis Montes
|UD|| 6 (6) || February 1, 2002 || align=left|Palace Indian Gaming Center, Lemoore, California, U.S.
|align=left|
|- align=center
|Win || 4-0-0 ||align=left| Sergio Joel De La Torre	
|UD|| 6 (6) || October 4, 2001 || align=left|Scottish Rite Auditorium, San Diego, California, U.S.
|align=left|
|- align=center
|Win || 3-0-0 ||align=left| Altamir Souza Pereira	
|TKO|| 2 (4) || September 14, 2001 || align=left|Quiet Cannon, Montebello, California, U.S.
|align=left|
|- align=center
|Win || 2-0-0 ||align=left| Shinya Kiuchi	
|KO|| 1 (6) || February 17, 2001 || align=left|Kokugikan, Tokyo, Japan
|align=left|
|- align=center
|Win || 1-0-0 ||align=left| Michaelangelo Lynks	
|UD|| 4 (4) || November 30, 2000 || align=left|Hollywood Park Casino, Inglewood, California, U.S.
|align=left|
|- align=center

References

External links

1982 births
Living people
People from Maywood, California
Lightweight boxers
Super-featherweight boxers
Boxers from California
American male boxers